The  (abbreviated to ) is a non-profit anti-cult association established in May 1987, comprising about 300 lawyers in Japan.

The UC, founded by Sun Myung Moon in 1954, has long been accused of employing manipulative and coercive tactics to make victims donate large sum of money or buy overpriced items, in some cases more than what the victims can afford. According to the association the total of confirmed financial damages linked to the UC during the 35 years through 2021 has surpassed 123.7 billion yen (US$899.2 million).

Public statements
On December 24, 2013, the association along with victims of the UC publicly protested singer-actress Junko Sakurada's comeback to the show business since her last retirement in 1992. Sakurada is a member of the UC and is accused of selling expensive religious items. The association believed that her comeback would spread the UC's influence and create more victims.

On September 17, 2021, the association published an open letter for the former prime minister Shinzo Abe, dissuading him from sending any congratulatory or advocating messages to the UC or its front organizations. The association feared that any message from Abe would endorse their anti-social activities in Japan. The letter was published after Abe had given an online speech on "Think Tank 2022 Rally of Hope" held by the Universal Peace Federation (UPF), which is also founded by Sun Myung Moon and Hak Ja Han in 2005. The video was cited as what motivated the suspected gunman, Tetsuya Yamagami who claimed to be a victim of the UC, to assassinate Abe on July 8, 2022, in Nara City, Japan.

Following the press conference by the UC's Tokyo branch on July 11, 2022 regarding the blame on the UC by Yamagami over the financial woe of his family, the association held its own press conference the next day to counter the UC's arguments. The UC claimed that after losing the 2009 legal battle in the Tokyo District Court, they strengthened compliance with the regulations of donation and had no more issues ever since. The association reported that the situation did not improve after 2009 and the UC still uses deceptive tactics to demand their members donate all their savings to the organization. In 2021 alone, the association received legal inquiries involving over 300 million yen from victims of the UC.

They stated that the Unification Church and their followers can continue practicing their faith, which is guaranteed by the Constitution of Japan, but without the benefits enjoyed by a registered religious organization such as tax exemption. Chief Cabinet Secretary Hirokazu Matsuno responded to the request on the next day. He stated that "the dissolution order is an extreme measure that they need to consider with utmost care based on the precedents and from the perspective of protecting the freedom of religion." He assured that the Ministry of Education, Culture, Sports, Science and Technology has already been seriously working on the social issues regarding the recent incident.

Key figures
  (executive director)
  (Tokyo office director)
  (acting executive director)

Notes

References

External links
 Japanese official site
 English official site

Anti-cult organizations
Non-profit organizations based in Japan
Organizations established in 1987